Gelasius of Cyzicus was an ecclesiastical writer in the 5th century. The often attributed name Gelasius is an error of Photius I of Constantinople and of the editor of the editio princeps; the anonymous author never mentioned his name.

The author tells us that he was the son of a priest of Cyzicus, and that he wrote in the Roman province of Bithynia in Asia Minor, about 475, to prove against the Eutychians, that the Nicene Fathers did not teach Monophysitism. These details he gives us in his preface. Beyond that nothing is known about him.

His "Syntagma" or collection of Acts of the First Nicene Council has hitherto been looked upon as the work of a sorry compiler; recent investigations, however, point to its being of some importance. It is divided into three books: book I treats of the Life of Constantine down to 323; book II of History of the Council in thirty-six chapters; of book III only fragments were originally published, until the whole of book III was discovered by Cardinal Mai in the Ambrosian Library. 

The serious study of the sources of Gelasius may be said to have begun with Turner's identification of the long passages taken from Rufinus in book II. A complete analysis of the sources is in Löscheke, whose efforts it would appear, have restored to Gelasius a place among serious Church historians, of which he has been wrongly deprived and have also lent weight to the hitherto generally rejected idea that there was an official record of the Acts of the Council of Nicaea; and further that it was from this record that Dalmatius derived the opening discourse of Constantine, the confession of Hosius, the dialogue with Phaedo, and the nine dogmatic constitutions, which Hefele had pronounced "most certainly spurious".

The "John" to whom Gelasius refers, as a forerunner of Theodoret, is still unidentified; from him were derived the published portions of book III, the letters of Constantine to Arius, to the Church of Nicomedia and to Theodotus, all of which Löschcke contends are authentic. He also proves that a comparison of Constantine's letter to the Synod of Tyre (335), as given by Gelasius and Athanasius, shows Gelasius to give the original, Athanasius an abbreviated version.

Notes

Sources
 English translation of the whole work from the Hansen edition.
 
 

Late Antique writers
5th-century Byzantine writers
5th-century Byzantine people